Egoist anarchism or anarcho-egoism, often shortened as simply egoism, is a school of anarchist thought that originated in the philosophy of Max Stirner, a 19th-century philosopher whose "name appears with familiar regularity in historically orientated surveys of anarchist thought as one of the earliest and best known exponents of individualist anarchism".

Max Stirner and his philosophy 

Max Stirner's philosophy is usually called "egoism". He says that the egoist rejects pursuit of devotion to "a great idea, a good cause, a doctrine, a system, a lofty calling", saying that the egoist has no political calling, but rather "lives themselves out" without regard to "how well or ill humanity may fare thereby". Stirner held that the only limitation on the rights of the individual is one's power to obtain what they desire. He proposes that most commonly accepted social institutions—including the notion of State, property as a right, natural rights in general and the very notion of society—were mere "spooks" in the mind. Stirner wanted to "abolish not only the state but also society as an institution responsible for its members".

Max Stirner's idea of the Union of egoists was first expounded in The Ego and Its Own. The Union is understood as a non-systematic association, which Stirner proposed in contradistinction to the state. The Union is understood as a relation between egoists which is continually renewed by all parties' support through an act of will. The Union requires that all parties participate out of a conscious egoism. If one party silently finds themselves to be suffering, but puts up and keeps the appearance, the union has degenerated into something else. This union is not seen as an authority above a person's own will. This idea has received interpretations for politics, economics, romance and sex.

Stirner claimed that property comes about through might: "I do not step shyly back from your property, but look upon it always as my property, in which I respect nothing. Pray do the like with what you call my property! [...] What I have in my power, that is my own. So long as I assert myself as holder, I am the proprietor of the thing; [...]. Whoever knows how to take, to defend, the thing, to him belongs property". His concept of "egoistic property" not only rejects moral restraint on how one obtains and uses things, but includes other people as well.

Stirner's philosophy though being individualist, has influenced some libertarian communists and anarcho-communists. Forms of libertarian communism such as insurrectionary anarchism are influenced by Stirner. Anarcho-communist Emma Goldman was influenced by both Stirner and Peter Kropotkin and blended their philosophies together in her own.

Influence and expansion

Early development

Europe 

The Scottish-born German writer John Henry Mackay found out about Stirner while reading a copy of Friedrich Albert Lange's History of Materialism and Critique of its Present Importance. Mackay later looked for a copy of The Ego and Its Own and after being fascinated with it wrote a biography of Stirner (Max Stirner – sein Leben und sein Werk), published in German in 1898. Mackay's propaganda of Stirnerist egoism and of male homosexual and bisexual rights influenced Adolf Brand who in 1896 published the world's first ongoing homosexual publication, Der Eigene. The name of that publication was taken from Stirner—who had greatly influenced the young Brand—and refers to Stirner's concept of "self-ownership" of the individual. Der Eigene concentrated on cultural and scholarly material and may have averaged around 1500 subscribers per issue during its lifetime. Benjamin Tucker followed this journal from the United States.

It appeared in 1919 as a weekly, then sporadically until 1925 and was edited by cousins Anselm Ruest (pseudonym for Ernst Samuel) and Mynona (pseudonym for Salomo Friedlaender). Its title was adopted from the book Der Einzige und sein Eigentum (The Ego and Its Own) by Max Stirner. Another influence was the thought of German philosopher Friedrich Nietzsche. The publication was connected to the local expressionist artistic current and the transition from it towards dada.

Stirnerian egoism became a main influence on European individualist anarchism including its main proponents in the early 20th century such as Émile Armand, Han Ryner and Gérard de Lacaze-Duthiers in France, Renzo Novatore in Italy, Miguel Giménez Igualada in Spain and in Russia Lev Chernyi.

For Novatore, who was "a reader of Stirner, but not for that a disciple of stirnerism", the affirmation of the individual, the continuous tension toward freedom, led inevitably to the struggle against the existent, to the violent battle against authority and against every type of 'wait-and-see' attitude". Émile Armand's Stirnerist egoism (as well as his Nietzschetianism) can be appreciated when he writes in Anarchist Individualism as Life and Activity (1907) when he says that anarchists "are pioneers attached to no party, non-conformists, standing outside herd morality and conventional 'good' and 'evil' 'a-social'. A 'species' apart, one might say. They go forward, stumbling, sometimes falling, sometimes triumphant, sometimes vanquished. But they do go forward, and by living for themselves, these 'egoists', they dig the furrow, they open the broach through which will pass those who deny archism, the unique ones who will succeed them". In Russia, individualist anarchism inspired by Stirner "combined with an appreciation for Friedrich Nietzsche attracted a small following of bohemian artists and intellectuals such as Lev Chernyi, as well as a few lone wolves who found self-expression in crime and violence". They rejected organizing, believing that only unorganized individuals were safe from coercion and domination, believing this kept them true to the ideals of anarchism (see illegalism).

Stirner's influence also expressed itself in a different way in Spanish and French individualist anarchism: "The theoretical positions and the vital experiences of French individualism are deeply iconoclastic and scandalous, even within libertarian circles. The call of nudist naturism (see anarcho-naturism), the strong defense of birth control methods, the idea of "unions of egoists" with the sole justification of sexual practices, that will try to put in practice, not without difficulties, will establish a way of thought and action, and will result in sympathy within some, and a strong rejection within others".

Illegalism 

Illegalism was an anarchist practice that developed primarily in France, Italy, Belgium and Switzerland during the early 1900s that found justification in Stirner's philosophy. The illegalists openly embraced criminality as a lifestyle. Illegalists usually did not seek moral basis for their actions, recognizing only the reality of "might" rather than "right". For the most part, illegal acts were done simply to satisfy personal desires and needs, not for some greater ideal, although some committed crimes as a form of propaganda of the deed.

Illegalism first rose to prominence among a generation of Europeans inspired by the unrest of the 1890s, during which Ravachol, Émile Henry, Auguste Vaillant and Sante Geronimo Caserio committed daring crimes in the name of anarchism in what is known as propaganda of the deed. The French Bonnot Gang were the most famous group to embrace illegalism.

The illegalists broke from anarchists like Clément Duval and Marius Jacob who justified theft with a theory of la reprise individuelle. Instead, the illegalists argued that their actions required no moral basis as illegal acts were performed not in the name of a higher ideal, but in pursuit of one's own desires.

As a reaction to this, French anarchist communists attempted to distance themselves from illegalism and anarchist individualism as a whole. In August 1913, the Fédération Communiste-Anarchistes (FCA) condemned individualism as bourgeois and more in keeping with capitalism than communism. An article believed to have been written by Peter Kropotkin in the British anarchist paper Freedom argued: "Simple-minded young comrades were often led away by the illegalists' apparent anarchist logic; outsiders simply felt disgusted with anarchist ideas and definitely stopped their ears to any propaganda".

United States and United Kingdom 

Some American individualist anarchists such as Benjamin Tucker abandoned natural rights positions and converted to Max Stirner's egoist anarchism. Rejecting the idea of moral rights, Tucker said that there were only two rights, "the right of might" and "the right of contract". He also said after converting to egoist individualism: "In times past...it was my habit to talk glibly of the right of man to land. It was a bad habit, and I long ago sloughed it off....Man's only right to land is his might over it". In adopting Stirnerite egoism, Tucker rejected natural rights which had long been considered the foundation of his beliefs. This rejection galvanized the movement into fierce debates, with the natural rights proponents accusing the egoists of destroying individualist anarchism itself. So bitter was the conflict that a number of natural rights proponents withdrew from the pages of Liberty in protest even though they had hitherto been among its frequent contributors. Thereafter, Liberty championed egoism although its general content did not change significantly.

Several periodicals were undoubtedly influenced by Liberty'''s presentation of egoism. They included the following: I published by Clarence Lee Swartz, edited by William Walstein Gordak and J. William Lloyd (all associates of Liberty); and The Ego and The Egoist, both of which were edited by Edward H. Fulton. Among the egoist papers that Tucker followed were the German Der Eigene, edited by Adolf Brand; and The Eagle and The Serpent, issued from London. The latter, the most prominent English language egoist journal, was published from 1898 to 1900 with the subtitle A Journal of Egoistic Philosophy and Sociology.

American anarchists who adhered to egoism include Benjamin Tucker, John Beverley Robinson, Steven T. Byington, Hutchins Hapgood, James L. Walker, Victor Yarros and Edward H. Fulton. John Beverley Robinson wrote an essay called "Egoism" in which he states: "Modern egoism, as propounded by Stirner and Nietzsche, and expounded by Ibsen, Shaw and others, is all these; but it is more. It is the realization by the individual that they are an individual; that, as far as they are concerned, they are the only individual". Steven T. Byington was a one-time proponent of Georgism who later converted to egoist Stirnerist positions after associating with Benjamin Tucker. He is known for translating two important anarchist works into English from German: Stirner's The Ego and Its Own and Paul Eltzbacher's Anarchism: Exponents of the Anarchist Philosophy (also published by Dover with the title The Great Anarchists: Ideas and Teachings of Seven Major Thinkers).

James L. Walker (sometimes known by the pen name Tak Kak) was one of the main contributors to Benjamin Tucker's Liberty. He published his major philosophical work called Philosophy of Egoism in the May 1890 to September 1891 in issues of the publication Egoism. James L. Walker published the work The Philosophy of Egoism in which he argued that egoism "implies a rethinking of the self-other relationship, nothing less than "a complete revolution in the relations of mankind" that avoids both the "archist" principle that legitimates domination and the "moralist" notion that elevates self-renunciation to a virtue. Walker describes himself as an "egoistic anarchist" who believed in both contract and cooperation as practical principles to guide everyday interactions". For Walker, the egoist rejects notions of duty and is indifferent to the hardships of the oppressed whose consent to their oppression enslaves not only them, but those who do not consent. The egoist comes to self-consciousness, not for the God's sake, not for humanity's sake, but for his or her own sake. For him, "[c]ooperation and reciprocity are possible only among those who are unwilling to appeal to fixed patterns of justice in human relationships and instead focus on a form of reciprocity, a union of egoists, in which person each finds pleasure and fulfillment in doing things for others". Walker thought that "what really defines egoism is not mere self-interest, pleasure, or greed; it is the sovereignty of the individual, the full expression of the subjectivity of the individual ego".

Friedrich Nietzsche (see anarchism and Friedrich Nietzsche) and Stirner were frequently compared by French "literary anarchists" and anarchist interpretations of Nietzschean ideas appear to have also been influential in the United States. One researcher notes: "Indeed, translations of Nietzsche's writings in the United States very likely appeared first in Liberty, the anarchist journal edited by Benjamin Tucker". He adds that "Tucker preferred the strategy of exploiting his writings, but proceeding with due caution: 'Nietzsche says splendid things, – often, indeed, Anarchist things, – but he is no Anarchist. It is of the Anarchists, then, to intellectually exploit this would-be exploiter. He may be utilized profitably, but not prophetably'".

Anarcha-feminist Emma Goldman was influenced by both Stirner and Peter Kropotkin as well as the Russian strain of individualist anarchism and blended these philosophies together in her own as shown in books of hers such as Anarchism And Other Essays. There she defends both Stirner and Nietzsche when she says: "The most disheartening tendency common among readers is to tear out one sentence from a work, as a criterion of the writer's ideas or personality [...] It is the same narrow attitude which sees in Max Stirner naught but the apostle of the theory 'each for himself, the devil take the hind one.' That Stirner's individualism contains the greatest social possibilities is utterly ignored. Yet, it is nevertheless true that if society is ever to become free, it will be so through liberated individuals, whose free efforts make society". Egoism within anarchism is usually associated with individualist anarchism, but it found admiration in the mainstream social anarchists such as anarcha-feminists and Federica Montseny (who also admired Nietzsche). Max Baginski was an important collaborator in Goldman's publication Mother Earth. Bagisnki in an essay titled "Stirner: The Ego and His Own" published in Mother Earth puts forward an anarcho-communist interpretation of Stirner's philosophy when he manifests that "[f]ully as heartily the Communists concur with Stirner when he puts the word take in place of demand—that leads to the dissolution of property, to expropriation. Individualism and Communism go hand in hand".

Enrico Arrigoni (pseudonym Frank Brand) was an Italian American individualist anarchist Lathe operator, house painter, bricklayer, dramatist and political activist influenced by the work of Max Stirner. He took the pseudonym Brand from a fictional character in one of Henrik Ibsen´s plays. In the 1910s, he started becoming involved in anarchist and anti-war activism around Milan. From the 1910s until the 1920s, he participated in anarchist activities and popular uprisings in various countries including Switzerland, Germany, Hungary, Argentina and Cuba. He lived from the 1920s onwards in New York City, where he edited the individualist anarchist eclectic journal Eresia in 1928. He also wrote for other American anarchist publications such as L' Adunata dei refrattari, Cultura obrera, Controcorrente and Intessa libertaria.

 Latin America 
Argentine anarchist historian Ángel Cappelletti reports that in Argentina "[a]mong the workers that came from Europe in the two first decades of the century, there was curiously some stirnerian individualists influenced by the philosophy of Nietzsche, that saw syndicalism as a potential enemy of anarchist ideology. They established...affinity groups that in 1912 came to, according to Max Nettlau, to the number of 20. In 1911 there appeared, in Colón, the periodical El Único, that defined itself as 'Publicación individualista'".

Vicente Rojas Lizcano, whose pseudonym was Biófilo Panclasta, was a Colombian individualist anarchist writer and activist. In 1904, he began using the name Biofilo Panclasta ("Biofilo" in Spanish stands for "lover of life" and "Panclasta" for "enemy of all"). He visited more than fifty countries propagandizing for anarchism which in his case was highly influenced by the thought of Stirner and Nietszche. Among his written works there are Siete años enterrado vivo en una de las mazmorras de Gomezuela: Horripilante relato de un resucitado (Seven Years Buried Alive in a Gomezuelan Dungeon: The Horrifying Story of a Man Revived) (1932) and Mis prisiones, mis destierros y mi vida (My Prisons, My Exiles, My Life) (1929) which talk about his many adventures while living his life as an adventurer, activist and vagabond as well as his thought and the many times he was imprisoned in different countries.

Horst Matthai Quelle was a Spanish language German anarchist philosopher influenced by Stirner. In 1938, at the beginning of the German economic crisis and the rise of Nazism and fascism in Europe, Quelle moved to Mexico and earned his undergraduate degree, master's and doctorate in philosophy at the National Autonomous University of Mexico, where he returned as a professor of philosophy in the 1980s. Quelle argued that since the individual gives form to the world, he is those objects, the others and the whole universe. One of his main views was a "theory of infinite worlds" which for him was developed by pre-Socratic philosophers.

 Japan 
Jun Tsuji was a Japanese anarchist, Epicurean and Dadaist shakuhachi musician, actor and Bohemian who after discovering and adhering to Stirner's philosophy proceeded to translate The Ego and Its Own into the Japanese language. Stirner also influenced the Japanese anarchist writer and activist Sakae Osugi who also received the influence of Nietzsche, Henri Bergson, Peter Kropotkin and Georges Sorel.

 Mid-20th century 
In 1939, the anarcho-pacifist French individualist anarchist André Arru started his activities as an orator and writer with a conference on Max Stirner and his book The Ego and His Own French individualist anarchists grouped behind Émile Armand and published  after World War II. , whose name was inspired by the French translation of The Ego and its Own (in French ) went from 1945 to 1956 with a total of 110 numbers. In 1956, the Spanish individualist anarchist Miguel Giménez Igualada published an extensive treatise on Stirner which he dedicated to fellow individualist anarchist Émile Armand. In the 1960s, the French anarcho-communist Daniel Guérin in Anarchism: From Theory to Practice says that Stirner "rehabilitated the individual at a time when the philosophical field was dominated by Hegelian anti-individualism and most reformers in the social field had been led by the misdeeds of bourgeois egotism to stress its opposite" and pointed to "the boldness and scope of his thought".

 Existentialist anarchism 

In the United Kingdom, Herbert Read was influenced highly by egoism as he later came close to existentialism. In Herbert Read Reassessed writes that in Read's Education Through Art (1943), David Goodway writes: "Here we have the egoism of Max Stirner assimilated in the anarchist communism of Peter Kropotkin". He cites Read for this affirmation which shows egoism's influence: Uniqueness has no practical value in isolation. One of the most certain lessons of modern psychology and of recent historical experiences, is that education must be a process, not only of individuation, but also of integration, which is the reconciliation of individual uniqueness with social unity [...] the individual will be "good" in the degree that his individuality is realized within the organic wholeness of the community.

Albert Camus devotes a section of The Rebel to Stirner. He consigns him to dwelling in a desert of isolation and negation "drunk with destruction". Camus also accuses Stirner of going "as far as he can in blasphemy". He proclaims that Stirner is "intoxicated with the perspective of justifying" crime although without mentioning that Stirner carefully distinguishes between the ordinary criminal and the "criminal" as violator of the "sacred". He mishaps by misquoting Stirner through asserting that he "specifies" in relation to other human beings "kill them, do not martyr them" when in fact he writes "I can kill them, not torture them"—and this in relation to the moralist who both kills and tortures to serve the "concept of the 'good. Although throughout his book Camus is concerned to present "the rebel" as a preferred alternative to "the revolutionary" he nowhere acknowledges that this distinction is taken from the one that Stirner makes between "the revolutionary" and "the insurrectionist"."

 Late 20th century and today 
Sidney Parker was a British egoist individualist anarchist who wrote articles and edited anarchist journals from 1963 to 1993 such as Minus One, Egoist, and Ego. In Ego and Society, he writes: "Against the mystique of the sociocrat, stands the conscious ego of the autocrat, whose being is pivoted within, and who regards 'society' simply as a means or instrument, not a source or sanction. The egoist refuses to be ensnared by the net of conceptual imperatives that surrounds the hypostatization of 'society' preferring the real to the unreal, the fact to the myth". Donald Rooum is an English anarchist cartoonist and writer with a long association with Freedom Press. Rooum stated that for his thought "[t]he most influential source is Max Stirner. I am happy to be called a Stirnerite anarchist, provided 'Stirnerite' means one who agrees with Stirner's general drift, not one who agrees with Stirner's every word". An Anarchist FAQ reports: "From meeting anarchists in Glasgow during the Second World War, long-time anarchist activist and artist Donald Rooum likewise combined Stirner and anarcho-communism".

During the 1990s in Argentina, there appears a Stirnerist publication called .

 Post-left anarchy 

In the 1980s, in the United States emerged the tendency of post-left anarchy which was influenced profoundly by egoism in aspects such as the critique of ideology. Jason McQuinn says that "when I (and other anti-ideological anarchists) criticize ideology, it is always from a specifically critical, anarchist perspective rooted in both the skeptical, individualist-anarchist philosophy of Max Stirner". Bob Black and Feral Faun/Wolfi Landstreicher also strongly adhere to Stirnerist egoism. A reprinting of The Right to be Greedy in the 1980s was done with the involvement of Black who also wrote the preface to it. Black has also humorously suggested the idea of "Marxist Stirnerism" just as he wrote an essay on "groucho-marxism". He writes in the preface to The Right to be Greedy: "If Marxism-Stirnerism is conceivable, every orthodoxy prating of freedom or liberation is called into question, anarchism included. The only reason to read this book, as its authors would be the first to agree, is for what you can get out of it."

Hakim Bey has said "From Stirner's "Union of Self-Owning Ones" we proceed to Nietzsche's circle of "Free Spirits" and thence to Charles Fourier's "Passional Series", doubling and redoubling ourselves even as the Other multiplies itself in the eros of the group". Bey also wrote: "The Mackay Society, of which Mark & I are active members, is devoted to the anarchism of Max Stirner, Benj. Tucker & John Henry Mackay...The Mackay Society, incidentally, represents a little-known current of individualist thought which never cut its ties with revolutionary labor. Dyer Lum, Ezra & Angela Haywood represent this school of thought; Jo Labadie, who wrote for Tucker’s Liberty, made himself a link between the American “plumb-line” anarchists, the “philosophical” individualists, & the syndicalist or communist branch of the movement; his influence reached the Mackay Society through his son, Laurance. Like the Italian Stirnerites (who influenced us through our late friend Enrico Arrigoni) we support all anti-authoritarian currents, despite their apparent contradictions".

 Post-anarchism 

In the hybrid of post-structuralism and anarchism called post-anarchism, the Australian political theorist Saul Newman has written a lot on Stirner and his similarities to post-structuralism. He writes: Max Stirner's impact on contemporary political theory is often neglected. However in Stirner's political thinking there can be found a surprising convergence with poststructuralist theory, particularly with regard to the function of power. Andrew Koch, for instance, sees Stirner as a thinker who transcends the Hegelian tradition he is usually placed in, arguing that his work is a precursor poststructuralist ideas about the foundations of knowledge and truth.

Newman has published several essays on Stirner. War on the State: Stirner and Deleuze's Anarchism and Empiricism, Pluralism, and Politics in Deleuze and Stirner discusses what he sees are similarities between Stirner's thought and that of Gilles Deleuze. In Spectres of Stirner: A Contemporary Critique of Ideology, he discusses the conception of ideology in Stirner. In Stirner and Foucault: Toward a Post-Kantian Freedom, similarities between Stirner and Michel Foucault. He also wrote Politics of the Ego: Stirner's Critique of Liberalism''.

See also 

 Individualist anarchism
 Anarchism and Friedrich Nietzsche
 Ethical egoism
 European individualist anarchism
 Philosophy of Max Stirner

References

External links 
 Union of Egoists website entirely dedicated to Egoism
 "Max Stirner and anarchism" by Conor Mc Loughlin
 Archive of egoist literature at the Anarchist library

 
Anarchist schools of thought
Ethical schools and movements
Individualist anarchism
Philosophical schools and traditions
Post-left anarchism